The Small Assassin (1962) is a short story collection by American writer Ray Bradbury.  The stories originally appeared in the magazines Dime Mystery Magazine, Weird Tales, Harper's, Mademoiselle, and in Bradbury's first book, Dark Carnival.

The title story was made into a movie in 2010.

Contents 

 "The Small Assassin"
 "The Next in Line"
 "The Lake"
 "The Crowd"
 "Jack-in-the-Box"
 "The Man Upstairs"
 "The Cistern"
 "The Tombstone"
 "The Smiling People"
 "The Handler"
 "Let’s Play 'Poison'"
 "The Night"
 "The Dead Man"

References

External links
 
 

1962 short story collections
Fantasy short story collections
Short story collections by Ray Bradbury
Ace Books books